"Magic Dance" (also known as "Dance Magic") is a song written and recorded by David Bowie for the 1986 Jim Henson film Labyrinth. It was released as a single in limited markets worldwide in January 1987. Upon Bowie's death in 2016, the single version of "Magic Dance" reached #63 on the iTunes chart in the UK.

Details and background 
Bowie wrote and recorded five songs for Labyrinth, in which he also starred as Jareth, the king of the goblins. "Magic Dance" was written for a scene in which Jareth and his goblins entertain a crying baby that has been wished away to them by the film's heroine, Sarah Williams. In the film, Bowie performs the number with Toby Froud as the baby, and 50 puppets and 12 costumed extras as the goblins.

Described as a "simple dance number that's driven by electric bass and emphatic drums", "Magic Dance"  includes song lyrics that refer to the 1947 movie The Bachelor and the Bobby-Soxer starring Cary Grant and Shirley Temple, in which the two have a call and reply verse: "You remind me of a man." "What man?" "The man with the power." "What power?" "The power of hoodoo." "Who do?" "You do!". In "Magic Dance," "man" is replaced with "babe" and "hoodoo" with "voodoo". According to Nicholas Pegg, the verse is an "old playground nonsense-chant" that was originally popularized by The Bachelor and the Bobby-Soxer.

Bowie performed the baby's gurgles in the song recording of "Magic Dance", as backing singer Diva Gray's baby, the intended vocalist, wouldn't gurgle on the microphone. In the actual scene of the film, baby vocals were dubbed in by a more cooperative infant. During the movie's production, and in the end credits, the song was referred to as "Dance Magic."

Release 
"Magic Dance" is the third track on the Labyrinth soundtrack, released in July 1986 to coincide with the film's U.S. premiere. In 1987 the song was released on 12" in limited markets, including the US. A single version was mixed but never released, and an edit of the "Dance Mix" (incorrectly labeled as the 'single mix') was released on the New Zealand edition of Best of Bowie (2002). The single was not released commercially in the UK until the digital download version was made available in early 2007.

Reception 
In 1986, "Magic Dance" peaked at #40 in New Zealand.
At the time of Bowie's death in 2016, "Magic Dance" was the 19th highest selling Bowie song digitally downloaded in the United Kingdom.

BBC America called "Magic Dance" "one of Bowie's most playful and underrated songs", while Vice'''s Kamila Rymajdo considered it to be "perhaps the most joyous song about magic, ever".
David Brusie of The A.V. Club called the song "infectiously silly", and wrote that it has a "manic energy". Writing for Gizmodo, Cheryl Eddy referred to the song as an "eternal tear-the-club-up fantasy jam". Ranking "Magic Dance" at number 3 on the list "The 10 Best Uses Of David Bowie Songs In Movies", Screen Rants Ben Sherlock considered it the best song from Labyrinth and wrote that it "still has the ability to reinvigorate a dying party more than 30 years later." Empire listed the song among the "catchiest earworms" from cinema.

Some critics have observed similarities between "Magic Dance" and Bowie's earlier song "The Laughing Gnome", as both are constructed around traditional nursery rhymes and feature comic goblin/gnome voices. Sasha Frere-Jones of the Los Angeles Times described the song as Bowie "essentially performing “The Laughing Gnome” again, except this time he and his gnomes come perilously close to rapping."

 Track listing 

 12": EMI America / V-19217 (US) 
 "Magic Dance" (A Dance Mix) – 7:06
 "Magic Dance" (Dub) – 5:22
 "Within You" – 3:28

 Download: EMI / i19217 (US) 
 "Magic Dance" (Single Version/Edit of 7" Remix) – 4:00
 "Magic Dance" (12" Remix/Dance Mix) – 7:16
 "Magic Dance" (Dub) – 5:31
 "Magic Dance" (7" Remix) – 4:39

 Personnel 
 David Bowie – vocals, backing vocals, producer
 Arif Mardin – producer
 Dann Huff – guitar
 Will Lee – additional bass, background vocals
 Steve Ferrone – drums
 Robbie Buchanan – keyboards, synthesizer, arrangement
 Diva Gray – background vocals
 Fonzi Thornton – background vocals

 References Bibliography'''

Labyrinth (1986 film)
1986 songs
David Bowie songs
Song recordings produced by David Bowie
Songs written by David Bowie
EMI America Records singles
Songs about dancing
Songs written for films